Xu Minghao (born 7 November 1997), better known as The8, is a Chinese singer and dancer based in South Korea. He is a member of the South Korean boy group Seventeen and its subunit Performance Team. In 2019, he had his official solo debut and served as one of the two dance mentors in the Chinese survival show Youth With You.

Early life and education
The8 was born in Haicheng, Liaoning, China on 7 November 1997. He attended Beijing Contemporary Music Academy.

Career

2008–present: Debut, singles, and Youth With You
In 2008, The8 appeared on the Chinese program CCTV Variety Show. Later on, he appeared on the Chinese program Day Day Up. In 2012, The8 participated in the 6th Shanghai World Dance Competition held from 27 to 30 April. He placed in the top 8.

He made his first appearance on Seventeen TV in late 2014. The8 debuted as a member of the South Korean boy band Seventeen with their first extended play 17 Carat on 29 May 2015. After debuting with Seventeen, The8 also landed a television role in Real Class - Elementary School in 2017. On 12 December 2017, Pledis Entertainment announced that The8 would be suspending his promotional activities due to a waist injury. It was not until the release of Seventeen's special album Directors Cut that he returned to promotions.

In 2018, The8 participated in the Chinese reality television show Chao Yin Zhan Ji alongside bandmate Wen Junhui. In 2019, he served as one of the two dance coaches (alongside Jolin Tsai) in the Chinese survival show Youth With You (season 1). The8 made his solo debut on 9 June 2019 with the single "Dreams Come True". On 4 May 2020, The8 announced the release of a second single, "Falling Down". It was released on 8 May 2020.

On 8 April 2021, The8 announced the release of his third single "Side by Side". It was released on April 13, 2021 in both Chinese and Korean. On 4 May 2021, The8 released a single called "Mom's Missed Call" along with bandmate Wen Junhui. All copyright proceeds will be donated to help children left behind in China. The single is a part of the Dandelion Philanthropy Music Project for the Chinese Children’s Charity Association. On 18 March 2022, The8 released the Chinese single "Hai Cheng" (海城).

Discography

Singles

Soundtrack appearances

Other songs 
Released on the Chinese digital music platforms QQ Music, KuGou Music and Kuwo Music unless otherwise specified.

Filmography

Television shows

Songwriting credits
All credits are adapted from the Korea Music Copyright Association, unless stated otherwise.

Notes

References

External links

 

1997 births
Living people
People from Anshan
People from Haicheng, Liaoning
Chinese K-pop singers
Korean-language singers of China
Singers from Liaoning
Pledis Entertainment artists
Chinese expatriates in South Korea
Chinese Mandopop singers
21st-century Chinese male singers
Hybe Corporation artists